The 1980 Winnipeg Blue Bombers finished in 2nd place in the Western Conference with a 10–6 record. They appeared in the Western Final but lost 34–24 to the Edmonton Eskimos.

Offseason

CFL draft

Roster

Preseason

Regular season

Standings

Schedule

Playoffs

West Semi-Final

West Final

Awards

1980 CFL All-Stars

References

Winnipeg Blue Bombers seasons
1980 Canadian Football League season by team